UMT can refer to:
 Universal Mobile Telecommunications System, a 3rd generation (3g) GSM-based cellular network standard.
 Metropolitan University of Tirana
 Moroccan Workers' Union (French: Union Marocaine du Travail)
 Universal Military Training
 Military Selective Service Act, conscription law in the United States (formerly known as the Universal Military Training and Service Act)
 UMT AG (United Mobility Technology AG) in Munich
 University of Management and Technology, Virginia in United States
 University of Management and Technology, Lahore in Pakistan
 Universiti Malaysia Terengganu (formerly known as KUSTEM)